Peter Wegner  (1932–2017) was a professor of computer science at Brown University, Rhode Island, United States. 

Peter Wegner may also refer to:

 Peter Wegner (American artist) (born 1963)
 Peter Wegner (Australian artist)

See also
 Peter Wagner (disambiguation)